Agave virginica, synonym Manfreda virginica, commonly known as the  false aloe, rattlesnake master, American aloe, Virginia agave, and eastern agave, is a species of agave. It is native to the central and southeastern United States and northeastern Mexico, and it is found in prairies, upland rocky glades, and sandy open woods.

Description
False aloe is acaulescent, meaning the stem is extremely short. Leaves and flowering stems grow from a bulbous herbaceous caudex. The leaf margins have fine teeth and leaves taper to a non-spiny tip. Leaf shape and size in Agave virginica vary with soil type, amount of shade, length of cold period, and position of leaf in the rosette. Speckles and spots occur frequently on some leaves in most populations, and some authors have used the informal designation "forma tigrina" for such variants.

Distribution and habitat
It is native to an area stretching from North Carolina west to Texas in the United States and south to Nuevo León and Tamaulipas in Mexico. Its habitat is sunny, well-drained areas in prairies, upland rocky glades, and sandy open woods.

Ecology
Agave virginica is adapted primarily to nocturnal pollination by medium-sized moths and larger sphinx moths. Diurnal pollination by large bees results in significantly less seed set than nocturnal and open pollination. Hummingbirds are also attracted to the blooms.

Gallery

References

virginica
Flora of North America
Plants described in 1903
Drought-tolerant plants
Butterfly food plants